Franco Scaglia (27 March 1944 – 6 July 2015) was an Italian writer and journalist.

Born in Camogli, the son of the conductor Ferruccio, Scaglia started his career as a journalist, collaborating with the newspapers  Il Messaggero, L'Unità, Il Tempo, Il Piccolo and Avanti!, among others. For over forty years he worked for RAI, notably being president of RAI Cinema between 2004 and 2013.

Scaglia was also a novelist, and among other things he wrote a cycle of novels about the adventures of a Franciscan friar, Padre Matteo (Father Matthew); the first novel of the series, Il custode dell'acqua, earned him the Campiello prize in 2002. During his varied career, he was also an essayist, an author of fables, a translator, a producer, a documentarist, a playwright, as well as a radio and television writer.

References

1944 births
2015 deaths
People from the Province of Genoa
20th-century Italian male writers
21st-century Italian writers
21st-century Italian male writers
20th-century Italian novelists
20th-century Italian dramatists and playwrights
20th-century Italian translators
Italian journalists
Italian male journalists
Italian dramatists and playwrights
Italian essayists
Premio Campiello winners
Italian male novelists
Male dramatists and playwrights
Male essayists
20th-century essayists
21st-century essayists
Writers from Liguria